Princess Mahisente Habte Mariam(born at Nekemte on 9 February 1937) is the widow of Prince Sahle Selassie, youngest son of Emperor Haile Selassie of Ethiopia. She is the daughter of Dejazmach Habte Mariam Gebre-Igziabiher, also referred as Kumsa Moroda (Oromo: Kumsaa Morodaa) heir to the former Welega Kingdom of Leqa Naqamte, and later served as governor of Welega province. Her mother was Woizero Yeshimebet Guma, grand daughterof Moti Joté Tulu of Wesstern Welega]] [Oromo people|Oromo]] noblewoman who was later married to Ras Mesfin Selashi, a leading Ethiopian aristocrat and close associate of Emperor Haile Selassie. Princess Mahisente is also the mother of Prince Ermias Sahle Selassie, the current President of the Crown Council of Ethiopia.

Princess Mahisente worked for many years with the United Nations Children's Fund (UNICEF) before her retirement.  The princess currently lives in the suburbs of Washington D.C. She is the last surviving daughter-in-law of Emperor Haile Selassie.

Honours

National 
 Grand Cordon of the Order of the Queen of Sheba.
 Jubilee Medal (1966).

Foreign honours 
  Member of the Royal Order of the Seraphim (Kingdom of Sweden, 19 December 1959).

References 

Living people
Mahisente Habte Mariam
Mahisente Hapte Mariam
1937 births
Princesses by marriage